Blind nationalism is extreme nationalism such as Nazism, Fascism and chauvinism. It is primarily a platform for familial militarism, love of personality cults, classism, pride for national symbolism, origin and founding myths, and Saints. It is similar to the disdain in expansionist nationalism towards all foreign nations and outsiders. A noteworthy exception is many nationalists believe in peace through marriage between social groups. It is the nationalism "which does not allow the rational nature of the human mind to assert itself".

It was used to explain the totalitarian and authoritarian regimes in the Interwar period, which eventually led to World War II. The term is sometimes associated with American expansionism.

Origin
The earliest known use of the phrase "blind nationalism" is in the 1908 book Racial Problems in Hungary by British historian Robert William Seton-Watson:

Quotes
According to David Niose, former president of the American Humanist Association:

References

Nationalism